The following is a list of some of the notable Egyptians inside and outside of Egypt:

Actors

Male actors

 Abdel Moneim Madbouly
 Adel Emam
 Ahmed Zaki
 Ahmed El Sakka
 Ahmed Ezz
 Ahmed Helmy
 Ahmed Malek
 Ahmed Mekky
 Ahmed Ramzy
 Ali Mansur
 Amr Waked
 Anwar Wagdy
 Emad Hamdy
 Ezzat Abou Aouf
 Fareed Shawky
 George Sidhom
 Hassan Youssef
 Hussein Fahmy
 Ismail Yaseen
 Kamal El Shennawy
 Kal Naga
 Mostafa Amar
 Mena Massoud
 Mohamed Emam
 Mohamed Ramadan
 Mina Ramez Farag
 Nour El-Sherif
 Omar Sharif, Academy Award nominee
 Omar Moustafa Ghonim
 Rushdy Abaza
 Rami Malek
 Ramy Youssef
 Saeed Saleh
 Salah Zulfikar
 Samir Ghanem
 Shoukry Sarhan
 Stephan Rosti
 Yehia Chahine

Zeeko Zaki

Actresses

 Amena Rizk
 Assia Dagher
 Asmaa Abulyazeid
 Asmaa Galal
 Bushra
 Eman El-Asy
 Faten Hamama
 Hana El Zahed
 Hanan Tork
 Hend Rostom
 Huda El Mufti
 Laila Elwi
 Lebleba
 Leila Mourad
 Lobna Abdel Aziz
 Mariam Fakhr Eddine
 Mary Queeny
 May Calamawy
 Mona Zaki
 Nermin Al-Fiqy
 Nelly Karim
 Shadia
 Sherihan
 Shwikar
 Soad Hosny
 Yasmin Abdulaziz
 Yasmin Ali 
 Yousra

Dancers and choreographers 

 Dina 
 Fifi Abdou
 Mahmoud Reda
 Nagua Fouad
 Nelly Mazloum
 Samia Gamal
 Soheir Zaki
 Tahiya Karioka
 Zeinat Olwi

Filmmakers and television directors 

 Ahmed El-Nahass
 André Hakim 
 Asaad Kelada
 Ash Atalla
 Assia Dagher
 Atef AlTayyeb
 Daoud Abdel Sayed
 Ezz El-Dine Zulficar
 Fadwa El Guindi
 Frank Agrama
 Hassan el-Imam
 Helmy Halim
 Henry Barakat
 Hussein Kamal
 Ibrahim El Batout
 Jehane Noujaim
 Kamla Abou Zekry
 Khairy Beshara
 Khaled Youssef
 Maher Sabry
 Mahmoud Zulfikar
 Mary Queeny
 Mohamed Khan
 Mohammed Karim
 Mohamed Said Mahfouz
 Raymond Hakim
 Robert Hakim 
 Salah Abu Seif
 Sam Esmail
 Tamer El Said
 Tamer Shaaban
 Tarek El-Telmissany
 Yousry Nasrallah
 Youssef Chahine

Theater actors, directors, producers and playwrights 
 Abdel Moneim Madbouly
 Abo El Seoud El Ebiary
 Alfred Farag
 Naguib Al Rehani
 Sam Esmail
 Tawfiq al-Hakeem

Film critics 

 Iris Nazmy
 Samir Farid
 Tarek El Shennawi

Radio and television personalities 
 
 Ahmed El Esseily
 Ahmed Mussa 
 Akmal Saleh
 Ali Faik Zaghloul
 Amr Ellissy
 Bassem Youssef
 Bob Francis (radio)
 Hamdi Qandil
 Hamed Gohar
 Lamis Elhadidy
 Mahmoud Saad
 Mofeed Fawzy
 Mona El-Saghir
 Mona El-Shazly
 Nagui
 Osama Mounir
 Tamer Amin
 Youssef El Deeb
 Youssef Hussein

Music

Musicians and composers 

 Abdu al-Hamuli
 Abu Bakr Khayrat
 Ammar El Sherei
 Amr Diab
 Aziz El-Shawan
 Baligh Hamdi
 Dawood Hussnei
 Gamal Abdel-Rahim
 Halim El-Dabh
 Hasan Rashid
 Kamal Al Taweel
 Kamel al-Khola'ie
 Mohamed Abdelwahab Abdelfattah
 Mohamed El Qasabgi
 Mohamed Fawzi
 Mohammed Abdel Wahab
 Mounir Mourad
 Moustafa Amar
 Omar Khairat
 Rageh Daoud
 Ramzi Yassa
 Riad Al Sunbati
 Rifaat Garrana
 Saleh Abdel Hai
 Sayed Darwish
 Sayed Mekawy
 Sheikh Imam
 Soliman Gamil
 Tarek Ali Hassan
 Wegz (trap singer)
 Yusef Greiss
 Zakaria Ahmed

Music directors and conductors 

 Ratiba El-Hefny
 Nabila Erian
 Selim Sahab
 Sherif Mohie El Din
 Youssef Elsisi

Songwriters 

 Abo El Seoud El Ebiary
 Abdel Rahman el-Abnudi
 Abdel latif Moubarak

Singers and pop stars 

 Abdel Halim Hafez
 Ahmed Adaweyah
 Amal Maher
 Amr Diab
 Angham
 Dalida
 Demis Roussos
 Ehab Tawfik
 Farid al-Atrash
 Fayza Ahmed
 Hakim
 Hamada Helal
 Hani Shaker
 Kamal Hosni
 Kareem Salama
 Karem Mahmoud
 Laila Mourad
 Mohamed Abdel Wahab
 Mohamed Hamaki
 Mohamed Mounir
 Mohammad Fouad
 Mounira El Mahdeya
 Moustafa Amar
 Rami Sabry
 Ruby
 Shaaban Abdel Rahim
 Shadia
 Sherine Wagdy
 Sherine
 Tamer Hosny
 Tony Kaldas
 Umm Kulthum

Architects, planners and engineers

Arts

Cartoonists and comic artists 

 Ahmad Nady
 Ahmed Ragab
 Ahmed Toughan
 Alexander Sarukhan
 George Bahgoury
 Gomaa
 Hussein Bikar
 Mustafa Hussein
 Salah Jahin
 Tarek Shahin

Painters 

 Abdel Hadi Al Gazzar
 Adel Nassief
 Adham Wanly
 Chafik Charobim
 Evelyn Ashamallah
 Farouk Hosny
 Fathi Hassan
 Gazbia Sirry
 George Bahgoury
 Georges Hanna Sabbagh
 Ghada Amer
 Hassan Mohamed Hassan
 Hussein Bikar
 Hussein El Gebaly
 Injy Aflatoun
 Isaac Fanous
 Kamal Amin
 Mahmoud Mokhtar
 Margaret Nakhla
 Salah Taher
 Diane Tuckman
 Seif Wanly

Sculptors 

 Adam Henein
 Hassan Heshmat
 Mahmoud Mokhtar

Literature

Authors 

 Abbass AlAqqad
 Abdel Hakim Qasem
 Abdel Wahab el-Miseiri
 Abo El Seoud El Ebiary
 Adel Darwish
 Adel Iskandar
 Ahdaf Soueif
 Ahmed Lutfi el-Sayed
 Ahmed Mourad
 Alaa Al Aswany
 Albert Cossery
 Alfred Farag
 Ayman Zohry
 Bahaa Taher
 Edmond Jabès
 Edwar al-Kharrat
 Ezzat el Kamhawi
 Farag Foda
 Fekry Pasha Abaza
 Gamal al-Banna
 Gamal Al-Ghitani
 Gilbert Sinoué
 Hasan Hanafi
Hussein Abdelfatah  
 Ihsan Abdel Quddous
 Iris Habib Elmasry
 Khalil Abdel-Karim
 Kamal el-Mallakh
 Leila Ahmed
 Louis Awad
 Masri Feki
 Mansoura Ez Eldin
 Mo Gawdat
 Mohammad Elsannour
 Mohammad Hassanein Heykal
 Mohammad Moustafa Haddara
 Mostafa Amin
 Mostafa Mahmoud
 Muhammad Aladdin
 Muhammad Husayn Haykal
 Muhammad Sa'id al-'Ashmawi
 Muhammad Jalal Kishk
 Mustafa Lutfi al-Manfaluti
 Nabil Farouk
 Naguib Mahfouz, Nobel Prize in Literature winner
 Nasr Abu Zayd
 Nawal El Saadawi
 Said El Kemny
 Salama Moussa
 Sonallah Ibrahim
 Taha Hussein
 Tarek Heggy
 Tawfiq al-Hakeem
 Yasser Thabet
 Yehia Hakki
 Yusuf Idris
 Zaki Naguib Mahmoud

Historians 

 Abd al-Rahman al-Jabarti
 Abd al-Rahman al-Rafai
 Al-Maqrizi
 Al-Mufaddal
 Al-Sakhawi
 Gawdat Gabra
 George Antonius
 George Elmacin
 Ibn Abd-el-Hakem
 Imam Al-Suyuti
 Iris Habib Elmasry
 John of Nikiû
 Manetho
 Menassa Youhanna
 Raouf Abbas
 Rifa'a el-Tahtawi
 Severus Ibn al-Muqaffa

Poets 

 Abdel Rahman el-Abnudi
 Abdel latif Moubarak
 Abdul Rahman Yusuf
 Ahmed Abdel Muti Hijazi
 Ahmed Fouad Negm
 Ahmed Rami
 Ahmed Shawqi
 Ahmed Zaki Abu Shadi
 Hafez Ibrahim
 Ibrahim Nagi
 Iman Mersal
 Mahmoud Sami al-Baroudi
 Mahmud Bayram el-Tunsi
 Mohammad Ibrahim Abu Senna
 Salah Jahin
 Gaston Zananiri

Journalists 

 Abo El Seoud El Ebiary
 Adel Darwish
 Ahmad Al-Khamisi
 Ahmed Toughan
 Amr Ellissy
 Assaad Taha
 Ayman Mohyeldin
 Ethar El-Katatney
 Ezzat el Kamhawi
 Farag Foda
 Farouk Abdul-Aziz
 Gamal Nkrumah
 Hala El Badry
 Ibrahim al-Mazini
 Iris Nazmy
 Khalil Mutran
 Khouloud Al-Gamal
 Mansoura Ez-Eldin
 Mohamed El-Tabii
 Mohamed Hassanein Heikal
 Mohamed Said Mahfouz
 Momtaz Al Ket
 Mona Eltahawy
 Mostafa Amin
 Muhammad Husayn Haykal
 Muhammad Jalal Kishk
 Nawara Negm
 Ola Naguib
 Osama Anwar Okasha
 Rawya Ateya
 Reda Helal
 Rifa'a el-Tahtawi
 Sabah Hamamou
 Safinaz Kazem
 Said Sonbol
 Salama Ahmed Salama
 Shahira Amin
 Soliman Kenawy
 Tarek Heggy
 Tawfiq al-Hakim
 Wael Abbas
 Yaqub Sanu
 Yasser Abdel Hafez
 Yasser Khalil
 Yasser Thabet
 Yosri Fouda
 Younan Labib Rizk
 Yousef Gamal El-Din
 Zain Abdul Hady

Intellectuals 

 Abdelmegid Moustafa Farrag
 Ahmed Lutfi el-Sayed
 Akram Habib
 Bayoumi Andil
 Magdi Youssef
 Rifa'a el-Tahtawi
 Salama Moussa
 Tarek Heggy
 Zaki Naguib Mahmoud

Lawyers 

 Ahmad Najib al-Hilali
 Ahmed Gamal El-Din Moussa
 Ali Sadek Abou-Heif
 Farouk Sultan
 Khalil Abdel-Karim
 Mohamed Kamel Leilah
 Stephan Bassily
 Taher Helmy
 Youssef Darwish

Business 
19th — mid-20th Century Feudalists
 Abbud Pasha
Nationalists (1923 — 1952)
 Talaat Pasha Harb
Post Infitah (1974 — )
 Ahmed Zayat
 Ahmed Zulfikar
 Dodi Fayed
 Gamal Aziz, also known as Gamal Mohammed Abdelaziz
 Hassan Allam
 Mohamed Al-Fayed
 Naguib Sawiris
 Nassef Sawiris
 Raymond Lakah
 Samih Sawiris
 Tharwat Bassily
 Youssry Henien
Held political posts
 Ahmed El Maghrabi
 Khairat el-Shater
 Mohamed A. El-Erian
 Mohamed Mansour
 Osman Ahmed Osman
 Rachid Mohamed Rachid
 Talaat Moustafa

Activists 

 Abdel Wahab El-Messiri
 Ahmed Douma
 Ahmed Seif El-Islam
 Ahdaf Soueif
 Alaa Abd El-Fattah
 Dina Zulfikar
 Gamal Eid
 George Isaac
 Hossam Bahgat
 Hossam el-Hamalawy
 Israa Abdel Fattah
 Kamal Khalil
 Kareem Amer
 Khaled Ali
 Laila Soueif
 Mahienour El-Massry
 Maikel Nabil Sanad
 Mohamed Lotfy
 Mona Eltahawy
 Mona Seif
 Nawara Negm
 Nancy Okail
 Rehab Bassam
 Sameh Naguib
 Wael Abbas
 Wael Ghonim
 Wael Khalil
 Yasser Thabet
 Abdelsalam Elkhadrawy

Government

Diplomats 

 Abdel Hamid Badawi
 Abdul Rahman Hassan Azzam
 Ahmed Aboul Gheit
 Ahmed Asmat Abdel-Meguid
 Ahmed Maher
 Ali Maher
 Amr Moussa
 Ashraf Ghorbal
 Aziz Ezzat Pasha
 Boutros Boutros Ghali
 F. D. Amr Bey
 Helmy Bahgat Badawi
 Ihab el-Sherif
 Ismail Chirine
 Jean-Sélim Kanaan
 Kamil Abdul Rahim
 Maged A. Abdelaziz
 Mahmoud Riad
 Mohammed Bassiouni
 Mohamed ElBaradei
 Mohamed Hafez Ismail
 Mohammed Hassan El-Zayyat
 Mohammed Murad Ghaleb
 Muhammad Ibrahim Kamel
 Muhammad Shaaban
 Nabil Fahmi
 Nadia Younes
 Omar Sharaf
 Ramzy Ezzeldin Ramzy
 Sameh Shoukry
 Tahseen Bashir

Caliphs 

 al-Adid
 Al-Amir
 Al-Faiz
 Al-Hafiz
 Al-Hakim bi-Amr Allah
 Al-Musta'li
 Al-Zafir
 Ali az-Zahir
 al-Mustansir

Monarchs 

 Abbas I
 Abbas Hilmi Pasha
 Cleopatra VII
 Farouk of Egypt
 Fuad I of Egypt
 Fuad II of Egypt
 Hatshepsut
 Ibrahim Pasha
 Muhammad Ali of Egypt
 Ptolemy I of Egypt
 Ptolemy II of Egypt
 Ptolemy III of Egypt
 Ptolemy IV of Egypt
 Ptolemy V of Egypt
 Ptolemy VI of Egypt
 Ptolemy VII of Egypt
 Ptolemy XII of Egypt
 Ptolemy XIII of Egypt

Queens of Egypt 

 Farida of Egypt
 Hatshepsut
 Narriman Sadek
 Nazli Sabri
 Nefertiti
 Queen Karomama
 Shajar al-Durr
 Sitt al-Mulk

Politicians 

 Abaza Family
 Abdul Rahman Hassan Azzam
 Ahmad Esmat Abdel Meguid
 Ahmad Fathi Sorour
 Ahmad Mahir Pasha
 Ahmad Najib al-Hilali
 Ahmed Aboul Gheit
 Ahmed Lutfi el-Sayed
 Ahmed Nazif
 Ahmed Shafiq
 Ahmed Urabi
 Ali Pasha Mubarak
 Amr Moussa
 Atef Ebeid
 Ayman Nour
 Bahey El Din Barakat Pasha
 Boutros Boutros Ghali
 Boutros Ghali
 Fouad Serageddin
 Hussein Al Shafei
 Isma'il Sidqi
 Joseph de Picciotto Bey
 Kamal Ramzi Stino
 Mahmoud Ezzat
 Makram Ebeid
 Mohamed AlBaradei
 Mohamed Anwar Esmat Sadat
 Mohammad Farid
 Mohammed Tayea
 Mokhtar Khattab
 Mostafa Elwi Saif
 Muhammad Mahmoud Pasha
 Mustafa Kamil Pasha
 Mustafa an-Nahhas Pasha
 Numan Gumaa
 Rafik Habib
 Saad Zaghloul
 Stephan Bassily
 Wafik Moustafa
 Youssef Darwish
 Zakaria Mohieddin
 Zulfikar family

Presidents 

 Abdel Fattah el-Sisi
 Adly Mansour
 Muhammad Anwar el-Sadat
 Gamal Abdel Nasser
 Muhammad Hosni Mubarak
 Mohamed Morsi
 Muhammad Naguib
 Sufi Abu Taleb

Scholars

Egyptologists 

 Abdul Latif al-Baghdadi
 Ahmad Fakhri
 Ahmed Kamal
 Alexander Badawy
 Aziz Suryal Atiya
 Dhul-Nun al-Misri
 Kamal el-Mallakh
 Labib Habachi
 Mahmoud Maher Taha
 Naguib Kanawati
 Pahor Labib
 Selim Hassan
 Zahi Hawass

Explorers 

 Ahmed Hassanein
 Hannu
 Ibn Selim el-Aswani
 Nehsi

Philosophers and Legal Scholars 

 Abd El-Razzak El-Sanhuri
 Abdel Rahman Badawi
 Abdel Wahab Elmessiri
 Arnouphis
 Hassan Hanafi
 Ihab Hassan
 Mustafa Mahmoud
 Plotinus
 Rifa'a el-Tahtawi
 Zaki Naguib Mahmoud

Scientists 

 Abbas El Gamal
 Abū Kāmil Shujāʿ ibn Aslam
 Ahmad al-Qalqashandi
 Ahmad ibn Yusuf
 Ahmed Zewail
 Ahmes
 Caleb Gattegno
 Ctesibius
 Diophantus
 Djer
 Elsayed Elsayed Wagih
 Eman Ghoneim
 Euclid
 Farouk El-Baz
 Farkhonda Hassan
 Gamal Hemdan
 Hamed Gohar
 Hero of Alexandria
 Hypatia of Alexandria
 Ibn al-Majdi
 Ibn Yunus
 Imhotep
 Mahmoud Samir Fayed
 Mahmoud El Manhaly
 Mohamed Atalla
 Mostafa El-Sayed
 Moustafa Mousharafa
 Nabil Hegazi
 Ptolemy
 Rana el Kaliouby
 Rashad Khalifa
Reda R. Mankbadi
 Riad Higazy
 Rushdi Said
 Sameera Moussa
 Sharif Basyouni
 Taher ElGamal
 Tarek Ali Hassan
 Theon of Alexandria
 Wafik El-Deiry
 Yehia El-Mashad
 Zosimos of Panopolis

Physicians and surgeons 

 Ahmed Shafik
 Ali ibn Ridwan
 Da'ud Abu al-Fadl
 Emin Pasha
 Gorgi Sobhi
 Hilana Sedarous
 Ibrahim Nagi
 Imhotep
 Isaac Israeli ben Solomon
 Magdi Yacoub
 Magdy Ishak
 Mohammed Aboul-Fotouh Hassab
 Muhammed Taher Pasha
 Naguib Pasha Mahfouz
 Nagy Habib
 Nawal El Saadawi
 Paul Ghalioungui
 Samy Azer
 Tarek Ali Hassan
 Yahya of Antioch
 Yasser Elbatrawy

Pioneering women 

 Doria Shafik
 Ester Fanous
 Farkhonda Hassan
 Hoda Sharawy
 Jihan Sadat
 Lotfia ElNadi
 Magda Iskander
 Safeya Zaghloul
 Mona Zulficar
 Maya Morsy
 Rania Al-Mashat

Religion

Prophets 

 Moses
 Joseph
 Aaron
 Amram

Saints 

 Abdel Messih El-Makari
 Abraam Bishop of Fayoum
 Anianus of Alexandria
 Anthony the Great
 Athanasius of Alexandria
 Catherine of Alexandria
 Cyril of Alexandria
 Cyrus and John
 Demiana
 Dioscorus of Alexandria
 Dorothea
 Euphrosyne of Alexandria
 Felix and Regula
 Hilarion
 Hyacinth and Protus
 John the Short
 Macarius of Alexandria
 Macarius of Egypt
 Mar Awgin
 Mary of Egypt
 Moses the Black
 Saint Nilus
 Onuphrius
 Pakhom
 Parsoma
 Paul of Tammah
 Paul the Simple
 Pavly the Anchorite
 Pishoy
 Pope Abraham of Alexandria
 Alexander of Alexandria
 Cyril VI
 Demetrius of Alexandria
 Pope Matthew I of Alexandria
 Peter of Alexandria
 Saint Amun
 Saint Apollonia
 Saint Maurice
 Saint Menas
 St. Nilammon
 Saint Pambo
 Saint Sarah
 Saint Shenouda the Archimandrite
 Saints Chrysanthus and Daria
 Samuel the Confessor
 Serapion Bishop of Thmuis
 Simon the Tanner
 Verena

Preachers  

 Abadiu of Antinoe
 Abassad
 Abd al-Hamid Kishk
 Abdel-Halim Mahmoud
 Abraam, Bishop of Faiyum
 Ahmed Shaker
 Amr Khaled
 Anba Mikhail
 Athanasius, Metropolitan of Beni Suef
 Bishop Angaelos
 Habib Girgis
 Hassan Al-Banna
 John of Nikiû
 Matta El Meskeen
 Meletius of Lycopolis
 Menassa Youhanna
 Muhammad Abduh
 Muhammad Hussein Yacoub
 Muhammad Metwally Al Shaarawy
 Muhammad Sayyid Tantawi
 Origen of Alexandria
 Pope Cyril VI
 Pope Shenouda III of Alexandria
 Saint Paphnutius the Bishop
 Sayyed Qutb
 Bishop Serapion
 Severus Ibn al-Muqaffa
 Yusuf Al-Qaradawi

Sports personalities

Athletes 

 Ahmed Mohamed Ashoush
 Alaa Abdelnaby
 Dionysios Kasdaglis
 Hanan Ahmed Khaled
 Hassan Ahmed Hamad
 Hatem Mersal
 Hisham Greiss
 Khadr El Touni
 Mohamed Naguib Hamed
 Nagui Asaad
 Mohamed Salah

Basketball players
Zaki Harari (born 1936), basketball player
 Abdel Nader, basketball player

Fencers

 Alaaeldin Abouelkassem (born 1990), fencer, Olympic medalist
 Salvator Cicurel (1893–1975), Olympic fencer and Jewish community leader
 Mauro Hamza, fencing coach
 Saul Moyal, Olympic fencer

Soccer & handball players 

 Ahmed Fathi
 Ahmed Hassan
 Ahmed Hegazi
 Amr Zaki
 Emad Moteab
 Essam El Hadary
 Gamal Abdel Hamid
 Gamal Hamza
 Hany Ramzy
 Hassan Shehata
 Hazem Emam
 Hossam Ghaly
 Hossam Hassan
 Ibrahim Said
 Islam Abou Ouffa
 Mahmoud El-Gohary
 Mahmoud El-Khateeb
 Mahmoud Trezeguet
 Mido
 Mohamed Aboutreika
 Mohamed Elneny
 Mohamed Salah
 Mohamed Zidan
 Saleh Seleem
 Shikabala
 Taher Abouzaid

Tennis players

Karim Hossam (born 1994), tennis player banned from tennis for life
Youssef Hossam (born 1998), tennis player banned from tennis for life
 Issam Haitham Taweel (born 1989), tennis player

Wrestlers 

Kamal Ibrahim
 Karam Gaber
 Mohamed Abdelfatah

Other sports 

 Ramy Ashour, squash player
 Lamia Bahnasawy, archer
 Ahmed Barada, squash player
 Abla Khairy, swimmer
 Ōsunaarashi Kintarō, sumo wrestler
 Esmat Mansour
 Mahmoud Mersal
Yoav Raanan (born 1928), Israeli Olympic diver
 Amr Shabana, squash player
 Sam Soliman, boxer
 Ibrahim Hamadtou
 Ismail Essam
 Lucy Rokach
 Mark Seif, poker player
 Nasser El Sonbaty
 Hossam Youssef, volleyball player

Pharaohs

Prime Ministers of Egypt 

 Abd El Aziz Muhammad Hejazi
 Abdel Fattah Yahya Ibrahim Pasha
 Abdel Khaliq Sarwat Pasha
 Adli Yakan Pasha
 Ahmad Fuad Mohieddin
 Ahmad Mahir Pasha
 Ahmad Ziwar Pasha
 Ahmed Nazif
 Ali Lutfi Mahmud
 Ali Mahir Pasha
 Ali Sabri
 Anwar El Sadat
 Atef Ebeid
 Atef Sedki
 Aziz Sedki
 Boutros Ghali
 Essam Sharaf
 Gamal Abdel Nasser
 Hassan Sabry Pasha
 Hosni Mubarak
 Hussein Rushdi Pasha
 Hussein Sirri Pasha
 Isma'il Pasha
 Kamal Ganzouri
 Kamal Hassan Ali
 Mahmoud Fawzi
 Mahmoud Sami el-Baroudi
 Mahmoud an-Nukrashi Pasha
 Mamdouh Salem
 Muhammad Mahmoud Pasha
 Muhammad Naguib
 Muhammad Said Pasha
 Muhammad Sharif Pasha
 Muhammad Tawfiq Nasim Pasha
 Mustafa Khalil
 Mustafa el-Nahhas
 Nubar Pasha
 Raghib Pasha
 Riyad Pasha
 Saad Zaghloul
 Tewfik Pasha
 Youssef Wahba
 Zakaria Mohieddin

Military leaders 

 Abd-Al-Minaam Khaleel
 Abdel Ghani el-Gamasy
 Abdel Hakim Amer
 Abdul Munim Riad
 Abdul Munim Wassel
 Abu Zikry
 Ahmad Ismail Ali
 Ahmed Ali al-Mwawi
 Aibik
 Ali Mohamed
 Atef Sadat
 Frederick Peake
 Hussein Refki Pasha
 Ibrahim Pasha
 James F. M. Prinsep
 Kamal Hassan Ali
 Magdy Galal Sharawi
 Mahmoud el-Sisi
 Mahmoud Abdel Rahman Fahmy
 Mahmoud Fehmy
 Mahmoud Kabil
 Mohammed Aly Fahmy
 Murad Bey
 Rashad Mehanna
 Reda Seireg
 Saad El Shazly
 Suleiman Khater
 Youssef Sabri Abu Taleb
 Zakaria Mohieddin

Celebrity chefs 

 Christopher Maher
 Karine Bakhoum
 Michael Mina
 Essam Sayed

See also 

 List of ancient Egyptians

References